The High Tech High Village is a group of six High Tech High charter schools in San Diego, California. All of these schools together are called the "High Tech High Village." Most students that go to these schools simply call it "The Village" or "High Tech Village." All of the schools are within a few minutes walking distance of each other.

List of schools in the High Tech Village:
High Tech High
High Tech High Media Arts
High Tech High International
High Tech Middle
High Tech Middle Media Arts
Explorer Elementary
High Tech Elementary
Education in San Diego